Daneliya Tuleshova (born 18 July 2006) is a Kazakhstani singer. She represented  in the Junior Eurovision Song Contest 2018 in Minsk, Belarus with her song "Ózińe sen", finishing sixth.

Before Junior Eurovision, she won the fourth season of The Voice Kids Ukraine and was a finalist in Children's New Wave 2015. In 2019, she took part in The World's Best, representing her country alongside Dimash Kudaibergen. She was a finalist on season 15 of America's Got Talent.

Early life
Daneliya Tuleshova was born 18 July 2006 in the capital of Kazakhstan, Astana to Elena Tuleshova and Alexander Tuleshov, both originating from mixed Kazakh and Tatar families living in Kazakhstan for years. She has two younger siblings.

After recovering from a gymnastics injury at the age of four, she began practicing ballroom dancing. She also took contemporary dance classes in Almaty and simultaneously attended acting and singing classes. In late 2018, she was a sixth grader at the school Lyceum 56 where she focused on mathematics. Although Tuleshova was born in Astana, she said (in an interview with Kazakh video producer Rauana Kokumbaeva that was put on YouTube in February 2019) that her hometown is the city of Almaty.

Career

Career beginnings

At the age of eight, she was spotted by the organizers of the Kazakh singing competition Ayaglagan Astana, the selection round for the famous Children's New Wave, an international contest for young performers held annually in Russia. In 2015, Daneliya won the competition and reached the finals of Children's New Wave, where she won the Audience Award.

2017–2018: The Voice Kids Ukraine and Junior Eurovision

In January 2017, Tuleshova took part in the international singing competition, Hopes of Europe, where she won the grand prize. Later that same year, she auditioned for season 4 of The Voice Kids Ukraine. During the Blind Auditions, she performed Demi Lovato's song "Stone Cold". All three coaches; Monatik, Natalia Mohylevska and Vremya i Steklo, "turned their chairs" for her; she chose Monatik. After passing all the stages, she made it to the grand final. There, she performed the song "Ne tvoya viyna" and was ultimately announced as the winner of the competition at 10 years old. At the time, she was the first non-Ukrainian to win, but in 2019, Georgian singer Oleksandr Zazarashvyli won the fifth season.

In March 2018, Tuleshova won the Glimpse into the Future Award at the first International Professional Music Premium Bravo Awards in Moscow. After receiving her award, alongside French singer Zaz, she performed "Je veux".

On 22 September 2018, she was selected to represent Kazakhstan in the Junior Eurovision Song Contest 2018 in Minsk, Belarus with the song "Ózińe sen", written by Tuleshova, Artyom Kuz'menkov and Kamila Dairova and composed by Ivan Lopukhov. In the final, she performed third, following 's Rita Laranjeira and preceding 's Efi Gjika. At the end of the voting she had received 171 points, 68 points from the international juries and 103 points from the public vote, and finished in sixth place. An English version of "Ózińe sen", titled Seize the Time, was released on 21 October 2018.

2019: The World's Best
In 2019, Tuleshova auditioned for the American TV talent show The World's Best, performing the song "Rise Up", originally performed by Andra Day. In the battle rounds, she beat Japan's Manami Ito to qualify to the champion rounds. There, she performed "What About Us" but was ultimately eliminated from the competition, placing in the top 8.

2020: Da NeL and America's Got Talent
In 2020, Daneliya was scheduled to have a concert in Texas, United States. However, this was cancelled due to the COVID-19 pandemic.

In February 2020, during an interview with Kazakh TV channel Gakku TV, Daneliya announced that she would launch a new music project under the stage name "Da NeL". Her first single as "Da NeL", "хзчздз" (Nobody freakin' knows what the homework is), was premiered on YouTube on 4 February 2020. Her second single, "Мой день" (My Day), was premiered in April 2020. Succeeding singles are "OMG" and "FIRE", respectively premiered in May and June 2020.

In June, she auditioned for America's Got Talent singing "Tears of Gold" by Faouzia and passed with a yes from judges Simon Cowell, Sofia Vergara, Heidi Klum, and Howie Mandel. Her performance was praised by Faouzia, who described her voice and stage presence as "amazing".
She advanced to the live shows, performing "Sign of the Times" by Harry Styles on the 18 August Quarterfinals. She advanced to the Semifinals via online public vote. She performed to "Who You Are" by Jessie J, and advanced to the Finals.
For her final performance, she sang Sia's "Alive". She did not advance to the top 5 and ultimately placed 6th.

2021: Signing with 4 Chords Records and further music releases

Discography

Notes and references

External links

2006 births
Living people
21st-century Kazakhstani women singers
Kazakhstani pop singers
Kazakhstani child singers
Kazakhstani people of Tatar descent
Child pop musicians
The Voice Kids contestants
Junior Eurovision Song Contest entrants
America's Got Talent contestants
People from Astana
People from Almaty